Chapar Khaneh Rural District is a rural district (dehestan) in Khomam District, Rasht County, Gilan Province, Iran. At the 2006 census, its population was 11,620, in 3,439 families. The rural district has 15 villages.

References 

Rural Districts of Gilan Province
Rasht County